is a Japanese manga series written and illustrated by Kenichi Kondō. It has been serialized in Shueisha's shōnen manga magazine Jump Square since March 2019. An anime television series adaptation by OLM is set to premiere in Q3 2023.

Characters

Media

Manga
Written and illustrated by Kenichi Kondō, Dark Gathering has been serialized in Shueisha's shōnen manga magazine Jump Square since March 4, 2019. Shueisha has collected its chapters into individual tankōbon volumes. The first volume was released on June 4, 2019. As of December 2, 2022, eleven volumes have been released.

At New York Comic Con 2022, Viz Media announced that they licensed the series for English publication.

Volume list

Anime
In July 2022, it was announced that the series will receive an anime television series adaptation. It is produced by OLM and directed by Hiroshi Ikehata, with scripts written by Shigeru Murakoshi, character designs handled by Shinya Segawa, and music composed by Kohta Yamamoto, Shun Narita, and Yūsuke Seo. The series is set to premiere in Q3 2023.

References

Further reading

External links
  
  
 

2023 anime television series debuts
Adventure anime and manga
Anime series based on manga
Horror anime and manga
OLM, Inc.
Shōnen manga
Shueisha manga
Supernatural anime and manga
Upcoming anime television series
Viz Media manga